Mirte Kraaijkamp (born 25 April 1984, Venray) is a Dutch rower. She won two gold medals at the World Rowing Championships.

External links
 

1984 births
Living people
Dutch female rowers
People from Venray
World Rowing Championships medalists for the Netherlands
Sportspeople from Limburg (Netherlands)
20th-century Dutch women
21st-century Dutch women